Kayaş railway station is a railway station on the Başkentray commuter rail line in Ankara, Turkey. Located in the Kayaş neighborhood of the Mamak district, it is the eastern terminus of the line. The station closed down in July 2016 and the platforms were demolished, expanded and rebuilt; Kayaş station is expected to reopen on 12 April 2018 and will serve commuter, regional and intercity trains and by the end of 2018, high-speed YHT trains to Sivas.  The station house was built in the Turkish Neoclassical style, during the First national architectural movement in Turkey.

Before 2016, Kayaş station had two island platforms serving four tracks. (Two for commuter trains and two for regional and intercity trains) The station has been expanded to seven tracks with three platforms. Two of the seven tracks will serve as a layover siding for commuter trains.

References

Railway stations in Ankara Province
Altındağ, Ankara